Abdulrahman Al-Khaibari (born 3 February 1988) is a Saudi Arabian footballer who plays for Al-Orobah as a midfielder.

External links
 

Living people
1988 births
Association football midfielders
Saudi Arabian footballers
People from Unaizah
Al-Najma SC players
Al-Shoulla FC players
Al-Shabab FC (Riyadh) players
Al-Qadsiah FC players
Al-Kawkab FC players
Al-Orobah FC players
Saudi First Division League players
Saudi Second Division players
Saudi Professional League players